Jazy Garcia (born 14 July 1967) is a former cyclist from Guam. He competed at the 1992 Summer Olympics and the 2000 Summer Olympics.

References

External links
 

1967 births
Living people
Guamanian male cyclists
Olympic cyclists of Guam
Cyclists at the 1992 Summer Olympics
Cyclists at the 2000 Summer Olympics
American track cyclists
Place of birth missing (living people)